In Greek mythology, Lampetia  ( or ) was the daughter of Helios and Neaera. She and her twin sister, Phaethusa, were taken by their mother to guard the cattle and sheep of Thrinacia. She told her father when Odysseus' men slaughtered and sacrificed some of his ageless and deathless cattle.  In Ovid's Metamorphoses, she is one of the Heliades, daughters of Helios and Clymene whose tears turn to amber as she mourns the death of her brother Phaethon. In the Argonautica however, set explicitly after Phaethon's death, she and her sister are still tending to their father's flock.

References

Greek goddesses
Children of Helios
Personifications in Greek mythology
Metamorphoses into trees in Greek mythology